is a Japanese football player who currently plays for Kamatamare Sanuki.

Club statistics
Updated to 23 February 2018.

References

External links
Profile at Kamatamare Sanuki
Profile at Machida Zelvia

1991 births
Living people
Association football people from Tokyo
Japanese footballers
J1 League players
J2 League players
J3 League players
FC Tokyo players
Avispa Fukuoka players
Ventforet Kofu players
Ehime FC players
Tochigi SC players
FC Machida Zelvia players
Kamatamare Sanuki players
Association football forwards